The 2022–23 season is the 109th season in the existence of Aris Thessaloniki and the club's 5th consecutive season in the top flight of Greek football since their return there. In addition to the Super League 1, Aris are participating in this season's editions of the Greek Cup and for 4th consecutive time in a European competition and the UEFA Europa Conference League.

Aris was eliminated in third qualifying round of UEFA Europa Conference League in third qualifying round from Israelian Maccabi Tel Aviv with total score 2-3. 

Germán Burgos, after the elimination from UEFA Europa Conference League and the defeat from Panetolikos in second matchday, sacked and Apostolos Terzis was the caretaker for two matchdays. Before the game against Olympaicos, Alan Pardew was hired as the new manager of Aris Thessaloniki

First-team squad

Transfers and loans

Transfers in

Transfers out

Loans In

Transfer summary 

Spending

Summer:  4.000.000 €

Winter:  0 €

Total:  4.000.000 €

Income

Summer:  5.000.000 €

Winter:  0 €

Total:  5.000.000 €

Net Expenditure

Summer:  1.000.000 €

Winter:  0 €

Total:  1.000.000 €

Pre-season friendlies

Competitions

Overall

Overview 

{| class="wikitable" style="text-align: center"
|-
!rowspan=2|Competition
!colspan=8|Record
|-
!
!
!
!
!
!
!
!
|-
| Super League 1

|-
| Greek Cup

|-
| UEFA Europa Conference League

|-
! Total

{| class="wikitable" style="text-align: center"
|-
!rowspan=2|Super League 1
!colspan=8|Record
|-
!
!
!
!
!
!
!
!
|-
| Regular Season

|-
| Play-off / Play-out Round

|-
! Total

Managers' Overview

Germán Burgos
{| class="wikitable" style="text-align: center"
|-
!rowspan=2|Competition
!colspan=8|Record
|-
!
!
!
!
!
!
!
!
|-
| Super League 1

|-
| Greek Cup

|-
| UEFA Europa Conference League

|-
! Total

Apostolos Terzis
{| class="wikitable" style="text-align: center"
|-
!rowspan=2|Competition
!colspan=8|Record
|-
!
!
!
!
!
!
!
!
|-
| Super League 1

|-
| Greek Cup

|-
| UEFA Europa Conference League

|-
! Total

Alan Pardew
{| class="wikitable" style="text-align: center"
|-
!rowspan=2|Competition
!colspan=8|Record
|-
!
!
!
!
!
!
!
!
|-
| Super League 1

|-
| Greek Cup

|-
| UEFA Europa Conference League

|-
! Total

Super League 1

Regular season

League table

Results summary

Results by matchday

Matches

Greek Football Cup

Round of 16

Quarter-finals

UEFA Europa Conference League

Second qualifying round

Third qualifying round

Squad statistics

Appearances

Goals

Clean Sheets

Players' awards

Best Goal (Super League 1)

Player of the Month (Super League 1)

References

External links 

Aris Thessaloniki F.C. seasons
Aris Thessaloniki
Aris